Cladomelea is a genus of African orb-weaver spiders first described by Eugène Simon in 1895. Adult females of the genus are bolas spiders, capturing their prey with one or more sticky drops at the end of a single line of silk rather than in a web. Males and juvenile females capture their prey directly with their legs.

Species
 it contains four species:
Cladomelea akermani Hewitt, 1923 – South Africa
Cladomelea debeeri Roff & Dippenaar-Schoeman, 2004 – South Africa
Cladomelea longipes (O. Pickard-Cambridge, 1877) – Congo
Cladomelea ornata Hirst, 1907 – Central Africa

References

Araneidae
Araneomorphae genera
Spiders of Africa
Taxa named by Eugène Simon